1999–2000 Országos Bajnokság I (men's water polo) was the 94th water polo championship in Hungary.

First stage 

Pld - Played; W - Won; L - Lost; PF - Points for; PA - Points against; Diff - Difference; Pts - Points.

Championship Playoff

Final standing

Sources 
Gyarmati Dezső: Aranykor (Hérodotosz Könyvkiadó és Értékesítő Bt., Budapest, 2002.)

Seasons in Hungarian water polo competitions
Hungary
1999 in water polo
1999 in Hungarian sport
2000 in water polo
2000 in Hungarian sport